Foot is a surname. Notable people with the surname include:

Caroline Foot (born 1965), British former swimmer
David Foot (journalist) (1929–2021), English journalist
David Foot, Canadian economist
Dingle Foot (1905–1978), British lawyer and politician
Henry Foot (1805–1857), English-born Australian cricketer
Hugh Foot, Baron Caradon (1907–1990), British colonial administrator and diplomat
Isaac Foot (1880–1960), British Liberal politician and solicitor
John Foot, Baron Foot (1909–1999), British Liberal Party politician
John Foot (historian) (born 1964), British historian specialising in Italy
Michael Foot (1913–2010), British politician and journalist, Labour Party leader (1980–83)
M. R. D. Foot (1919–2012), British historian
Oliver Foot (1946–2008), British actor and philanthropist
 Paul Foot (journalist) (1937–2004), British investigative journalist, political campaigner and author
 Paul Foot (comedian) (born 1973), English comedian
Philippa Foot (1920–2010), British philosopher
Robert Foot (1889–1973), director general of the BBC (1942–1944)
Samuel A. Foot (1780–1846), U.S. representative and senator
Sarah Foot (journalist) (1939–2015), British journalist and author
Sarah Foot (born 1961), British historian
Solomon Foot (1802–1866), lawyer and senator from Vermont
Victorine Foot (1920–2000), British painter